Columbine is the debut studio album by Danish singer-songwriter Aura Dione. It was released on 28 January 2008 in Denmark by Music for Dreams, and in Germany on 27 November 2009 by Island Records. The German edition includes the number-one single "I Will Love You Monday (365)", "Stay the Same" and "Lulla Goodbye", which did not feature on the original Danish release. A video was shot for the song "Glass Bone Crash". It was released on 8 December 2009.

The album peaked at number three in Denmark, where it has also been certified with Gold by IFPI for sales exceeding 15,000.

Track listings

Standard edition

International edition

Charts and certifications

Charts

Certifications

References

2008 debut albums
Aura Dione albums
Island Records albums
European Border Breakers Award-winning albums